Smittium is a genus of fungi in the order Harpellales. It is the largest genus in the order. As of 2013, there were 81 described species. Many of these have been formally described only recently; in 1998 there were just 46. Several have been transferred to Smittium from other genera, such as Orphella, Rubetella, Genistella, and Typhella. In general, the genus has a cosmopolitan distribution, but some species are limited to small regions.

Like most other fungi of the Harpellales, these are found in the guts of insect larvae. Smittium are most often resident in the larvae of aquatic flies. The genus was named for Smittia, the midge from which it was first isolated. The fungi can be found in black flies, mosquitoes, solitary midges, and non-biting and biting midges. The relationship between the fungus and the fly is usually commensal. Sometimes it is more mutualistic, such as when the fungus synthesizes vitamins or other nutrients for the host. One species, though, Smittium morbosum, can best be described as parasitic on its mosquito larva host, killing it by preventing it from molting. No other gut fungi are known to be lethal to their hosts in this way.

The host larva is infected with Smittium when it ingests the fungal spore. Smittium generally live in the hindgut of the fly larva, attaching to the chitinous gut lining via a hypha. When the fungus produces spores, they are excreted by the host.

Sometimes several species can be found in the gut flora of one host. S. brevisporum, S. bulbosporophorus, and S. inexpectans have been noted growing together, for example. Other genera of gut fungi can be present, as well, such as Genistellospora. Some Smittium can be found in a number of hosts, while others are more host-specific. S. heterosporum has been collected from nonbiting midges of the genera Sympotthastia and Potthastia, and from Cricotopus bicinctus. S. culicis has been found in Culex pipiens and the genera Eukiefferiella and Chironomus. S. chinliense was found in a crane fly larva (Antocha sp.). Host-specific Smittium include S. dimorphum, which has only been observed in the midge Boreoheptagyia lurida.

Some Smittium are useful in laboratory experiments. They are unusually easy to propagate in pure culture, and some 40% of the many Smittium species have been established as axenic isolates.

Perhaps the best known species of the genus has been Smittium culisetae. It is widespread and found in several host species, especially mosquitoes. It has been used often in laboratory research. Recent morphological and molecular studies indicated that it is different from Smittium species in the positioning of its zygospore, the shape of its trichospore (a type of sporangium), the immune responses it induces in hosts, its isozymes, and other molecular characteristics. The fungus was renamed Zancudomyces culisetae and placed in a monotypic genus of its own, Zancudomyces.

Species include:

Smittium aciculare
Smittium acutum
Smittium alpinum
Smittium angustum
Smittium annulatum
Smittium arcticum
Smittium arvernense
Smittium basiramosum
Smittium biforme
Smittium bisporum
Smittium brasiliense
Smittium brevisporum
Smittium bulbosporophorum
Smittium bullatum
Smittium caribense
Smittium caudatum
Smittium cellaspora
Smittium chinliense
Smittium chironomi
Smittium coloradense
Smittium commune
Smittium compactum
Smittium culicis
Smittium culicisoides
Smittium cylindrosporum
Smittium delicatum

Smittium dimorphum
Smittium dipterorum
Smittium ditrichosporum
Smittium elongatum
Smittium esteparum
Smittium fasciculatum
Smittium fastigatum
Smittium fecundum
Smittium fruticosum
Smittium gigasporum
Smittium gracilis
Smittium gravimetallum
Smittium hecatei
Smittium heterosporum
Smittium imitatum
Smittium incrassatum
Smittium inexpectans
Smittium insulare
Smittium kansense
Smittium lentaquaticum
Smittium longisporum
Smittium macrosporum
Smittium magnosporum
Smittium megazygosporum
Smittium microsporum
Smittium minutisporum

Smittium morbosum
Smittium mucronatum
Smittium naiadis
Smittium nodifixum
Smittium orthocladii
Smittium ouselii
Smittium paludis
Smittium parvum
Smittium pennelli
Smittium perforatum
Smittium phytotelmatum
Smittium precipitiorum
Smittium prostratum
Smittium pseudodimorphum
Smittium pusillum
Smittium rarum
Smittium rupestre
Smittium shaanxiense
Smittium simulatum
Smittium simulii
Smittium tipulidarum
Smittium tronadorium
Smittium tynense
Smittium typhellum
Smittium urbanum

References 

Zygomycota genera